Prostanthera calycina, the West Coast mintbush, limestone mintbush or red mintbush, is a species of flowering plant that is endemic to the Eyre Peninsula in South Australia. It is a small, more or less prostrate shrub with aromatic, elliptic to oblong leaves and red flowers.

Description
The leaves are strongly aromatic when crushed. Flowering occurs between September and December.

Taxonomy
Prostanthera calycina was first formally described in 1870 by George Bentham from an unpublished description by Ferdinand von Mueller and the description was published in Flora Australiensis.

Distribution and habitat
West coast mintbush is only known from the Eyre Peninsula in South Australia where it usually grows on limestone outcrops in mallee vegetation.

Conservation status
West coast mintbush is classified as "vulnerable" under the Australian Government Environment Protection and Biodiversity Conservation Act 1999 and the South Australian Government National Parks and Wildlife Act 1972. The main threats to the species include grazing, habitat fragmentation and road maintenance.

Use in horticulture
This mintbush is easily propagated from cuttings or by grafting onto Prostanthera nivea and grows best in dry climates in well drained soil.

References

calycina
Flora of South Australia
Lamiales of Australia
Taxa named by Ferdinand von Mueller
Taxa named by George Bentham
Plants described in 1870